Kennebec Savings Bank is a Maine-based community bank with more than $1 billion in assets. It is headquartered in Augusta, Maine. Forbes has voted Kennebec Savings Bank “Maine’s Best Bank,” topping Forbes’ list of “Best In-State Banks and Credit Unions.”

The bank is led by Andrew Silsby, who serves as president and CEO.

References 

Banks based in Maine
Private banks
Companies based in Augusta, Maine